Teocelo is a city in the Mexican state of Veracruz, located to 20 km from Jalapa-Enríquez on Federal Highway 180. It is bordered by: Ixhuacán, Xico, and Coatepec. The coffee of Teocelo is one of the best coffees produced in Mexico. Teocelo has a permanent program for recycling urban residues.

Surrounded by scenic mountainous terrain, the area has been featured in a number of popular American films.  Scenes from "Romancing the Stone" and "Clear and Present Danger" were filmed nearby at the well-known Cascada de Texolo.

External links
 Official page 
 Tree frogs and vinegaroons near Teocelo - description of nature in a canyon near Teocelo.

Populated places in Veracruz